The Women's 200m Freestyle event at the 2003 Pan American Games took place on August 13, 2003 (Day 12 of the Games).

Medalists

Records

Results

Notes

References
usaswimming
 swimnews

Freestyle, 200m
2003 in women's swimming
Swim